Illumination is the debut studio album by Australian electronic music band Miami Horror. It was released on 20 August 2010 by EMI. It features guest appearances from Neon Indian and Kimbra. The album was nominated for Best Dance Release at the ARIA Music Awards of 2011, but lost out to Cut Copy's Zonoscope.

Track listing

Notes
 "Holidays" contains a sample from "Sugar and Spice (I Found Me a Girl)" by Luther Vandross.

Charts

Weekly charts

Year-end charts

Release history

References

2010 debut albums
EMI Records albums
Miami Horror albums